Virtus Verona, founded as Unione Sportiva Virtus Borgo Venezia in 1921, sometimes referred to as Virtus Vecomp Verona for sponsorship reasons, is an Italian association football club located in Borgo Venezia, a district of Verona, Veneto. It currently plays in Serie C.

History
The club was founded in 1921 as Unione Sportiva Virtus Borgo Venezia.

Virtus Verona, the third football club in Verona behind Chievo and Hellas Verona, is a unique case in Italy of a club whose chairman, Luigi Fresco, had also been the head coach of the first team for over 38 years, since 1982, after the other historic president Sinibaldo Nocini, who was in charge for 20 years. The club is also notable for being the only Italian professional football team to field a reserve team in the regional amateur divisions.

The club was promoted into professionalism for its first time ever at the end of the 2012–13 season, after winning the national playoff tournament in which they were qualified as fourth-placed in the Girone C of Serie D.
At the end of the 2017–18 season, the club return into professionalism, in Serie C, the third tier of Italian soccer.

Colours and badge
The social colours are red and blue, traditionally arranged in vertical stripes.

The club’s historical badge is an ancile red palate, closed externally by a white crown, suitable to contain the social name (sometimes written in abbreviated form).

In 2014 this badge was replaced by a shield, in which the corporate name is simplified in Associazione Virtus Verona: the first and third words are placed in the palate field, while the second (colored red) is placed in a curved white band placed in a shield.

Current squad
.

Supporters
Virtus Verona supporters are known for their hardline anti-fascist and left-wing leanings. The group Virtus Fans created in 2006, was split up in 2015, from which 2 new groups emerged: Virtus Verona Rude Firm 1921 and the Lost Boys. The Virtus Verona Rude Firm 1921 have friendships with antifa supporters groups all over the world: Livorno Calcio, Cosenza Calcio, Wrexham, Olympique Marseille, FC St. Pauli, RSV Goettingen 05.

References

External links
 Official site

 
Association football clubs established in 1921
Serie C clubs
1921 establishments in Italy
Sport in Verona